Frederic William Hotchkiss Crane (November 4, 1840 – April 27, 1925) played in Major League Baseball. Joining the Brooklyn Atlantics club in 1862 with teammates Joe Start and Jack Chapman from the Enterprise club, his best season was in 1865 when he scored 71 runs in 18 games (second, behind Start) for the undefeated champions.

Sources

Major League Baseball first basemen
Brooklyn Enterprise players
Brooklyn Excelsiors players
Brooklyn Atlantics (NABBP) players
Elizabeth Resolutes players
Brooklyn Atlantics players
Baseball players from Connecticut
19th-century baseball players
1840 births
1925 deaths
People from Old Saybrook, Connecticut